Srey Santhor is a district (srok) located in Kampong Cham province, Cambodia. The district capital is Srey Santhor town located on the south bank of the Mekong River around midway between Phnom Penh and the provincial capital of Kampong Cham. Srey Santhor is in south western Kampong Cham and lies on the border with Kandal and Prey Veng provinces. It was briefly the capital of Cambodia during the post-Angkor era from 1431 to 1434. During the Middle Period, it was then known as Srey Sarchhor.

2000 Floods 
Between July and November 2000, Cambodia was subject to catastrophic flooding in all provinces bordering the Mekong River. The Mekong literally burst it banks and Cambodia experienced the worst flooding in 70 years. As most of Srey Santhor district is low lying and parallels the Mekong, Srey Santhor is subject to annual flooding when the Mekong rises. However, in 2000 90% of the land area in the district was flooded and 95% of the annual rice crop was completely destroyed.

Location 
Srey Santhor district is a central district of Kampong Cham Province. Reading from the north clockwise, Srey Santhor shares a border with Kang Meas district of Kampong Cham to the north across the Mekong. Koh Sotin district lies on the eastern border. To the south are Sithor Kandal and Pea Reang districts of Prey Veng province. The western border of the district is shared with Khsach Kandal district of Kandal province.

Administration 
The Srey Santhor district governor is Heng Vanny. He reports to Hun Neng, the Governor of Kampong Cham. The following table shows the villages of Srey Santhor district by commune.

Demographics 
The district is subdivided into 14 communes (khum) and 86 villages (phum). According to the 1998 Census, the population of the district was 91,765 persons in 18,224 households in 1998. With a population of over 90,000 people, Srey Santhor district has an average district population for Kampong Cham province. The average household size in Srey Santhor is 5.0 persons per household, which is slightly lower than the rural average for Cambodia (5.2 persons). The sex ratio in the district is 92.0%, with significantly more females than males.

Tourism 
Wat Vihear Suor is one of the popular touristic destinations in the district.

References 

Districts of Kampong Cham province